The Amateur Association Basket Alcamo is the main female basketball team from Alcamo.
The team plays at the stadium Palazzetto Tre Santi and the uniform is white and blue.

History 
Previously Known as Sport Club Alcamo, the team played in Serie A1 already in 1996.
Numerous notable athletes played for this team, including Angela Aycock, Cynthia Cooper, Lisa Leslie, Francesca Zara and Susanna Stabile.
In 1996 the Sport Club Alcamo reaches the final of the Ronchetti Cup.

Stadium 
The team plays at the 'PalaTreSanti. Built in 1990, it holds 1000 spectators. In the past hosted Universiades matches and in 2009 hosted many Basketball Trapani matches.

Notable players 
 Angela Aycock
 Cynthia Cooper
 Lisa Leslie
 Tari Phillips
 Francesca Zara
 Susanna Stabile
 Diāna Skrastiņa
 Roli-Ann Nikagbatse
 Karolina Piotrkiewicz
 Zsuzsa Tarnai
 Andra Simina Mandache
 Anna Caliendo

Women's basketball teams in Italy